This list of tallest buildings in Miami Beach ranks skyscrapers in the city of Miami Beach, Florida by height.

Miami Beach's history of skyscrapers began in 1929 with the completion of The Blackstone. For more than five decades between 1940 and 1995, Miami beach went on a skyscraper hiatus, with few buildings taller than  constructed. However, since 1995, Miami Beach has gone on a construction boom, as many of the city's skyscrapers were completed between 1995 and present. Thomas Kramer is well known for the negotiations with local government that allowed the building of the tallest towers in the Miami Beach Area. No Miami Beach buildings are among the tallest in the United States, but the city is home to three buildings at least . Overall, Miami Beach's skyline (based on number of skyscrapers over  ranks 2nd in the state of Florida, (behind Miami).

When built, they were the tallest beachfront towers in the United States, but this title was taken by Jade Beach and Jade Ocean in nearby Sunny Isles Beach, Florida, in 2008.

Tallest buildings
This includes spires and architectural details but does not include antenna masts. Existing structures are included for ranking purposes based on present height.

Timeline of tallest buildings
This lists buildings that once held the title of tallest building in Miami Beach.

Tallest buildings under construction or proposed

See also
 List of tallest buildings in Florida
 List of tallest buildings in Fort Lauderdale
 List of tallest buildings in Jacksonville
 List of tallest buildings in Miami
 List of tallest buildings in Orlando
 List of tallest buildings in St. Petersburg
 List of tallest buildings in Sunny Isles Beach
 List of tallest buildings in Tampa

References
General
Emporis.com - Miami Beach
Specific

External links
Diagram of Miami Beach skyscrapers on SkyscraperPage

Miami Beach

Tallest in Miami Beach
Miami-related lists